St. Charles Township is one of sixteen townships in Kane County, Illinois, USA.  As of the 2010 census, its population was 50,854 and it contained 19,043 housing units.

Geography
It is divided by the Fox River.

Cities, towns, villages
 Bartlett (west edge)
 Campton Hills (partial)
 South Elgin (partial)
 St. Charles (vast majority)
 Wayne (west half)

Demographics

School districts
 Geneva Community Unit School District 304
 School District U-46
 St. Charles Community Unit School District 303

Political districts
 Illinois's 14th congressional district
 State House District 49
 State House District 50
 State House District 55
 State Senate District 25
 State Senate District 28

Notable people
 Lester Frank Ward (1841-1913), sociologist

References
 
 United States Census Bureau 2009 TIGER/Line Shapefiles
 United States National Atlas

External links
 City-Data.com
 Illinois State Archives
 Township Officials of Illinois

Townships in Kane County, Illinois
Townships in Illinois
1849 establishments in Illinois